SCU: Serious Crash Unit is a New Zealand documentary series that aired on TV2. The show was cancelled after seven seasons.

Overview

SCU: Serious Crash Unit follows a New Zealand Police-based Auckland Serious Crash Unit as they investigate crashes and examine the evidence found at the crash scene to find out what happened, and what caused the accident.

Episodes

Season 1

Season 2

Season 3

Season 4

Season 5

Season 6

Season 7

Broadcasting
The following list is ordered by the date of the series premiere.

Ratings

Australia
In Australia, SCU: Serious Crash Unit was watched by 1.4 million viewers in its premiere episode, and received similar ratings in its second week. In its premiere week in Australia, SCU: Serious Crash Unit was the third most watched program in the five mainland state capitals.

The second series premiered Monday 8:00pm at 1.2 million viewers, and ratings remained between 1.2 and 1.7 million viewers, following a strong lead in from Border Security: Australia's Front Line.

References

External links
Official site

New Zealand documentary television series
2001 New Zealand television series debuts
Documentary television series about policing
TVNZ 2 original programming
TVNZ 1 original programming
Television series by Greenstone TV